"Tongue Tied" is a song by American indie rock band Grouplove, featured on their debut studio album Never Trust a Happy Song (2011). The song was released as the second single from the album on September 2, 2011. It was featured in an Apple iPod Touch commercial in 2011. On June 18, 2012, "Tongue Tied" reached the number-one position on the Billboard Alternative Songs chart, becoming their first number-one single. In May 2012, the song was covered by Fox television series Glee in the season 3 episode "Nationals". It also appears in The Three Stooges, Wadjda, Rock Band 4, GT Racing 2: The Real Car Experience, Premature and Fuser.

"Tongue Tied" received mixed to negative reviews from critics, with criticism directed towards the use of synthesizers. Despite its reception, it remains the band's highest charting single to date, becoming their first song to chart on the Billboard Hot 100, where it peaked at 42, as well as number 3 on the Rock Songs chart. The song has been performed on various late-night talk shows, as well as on the American musical comedy-drama television series Glee.

Background
"Tongue Tied" was written by the collective members of Grouplove and produced by Ryan Rabin. The song was recorded by Rabin at Captain Cuts Studios in Los Angeles, California. According to lead vocalist Christian Zucconi, "Tongue Tied" was conceived in swift fashion. While composing the piano score for a "really depressing, moody movie", Zucconi began to play around with various chords before settling on a melody. He then performed an instrumental version for bandmates Hannah Hooper and Sean Gadd.

Composition
"Tongue Tied" is a three-minute, 38-second rock and electropop song influenced by indie music. It incorporates elements of synthpop and post-punk. The song is composed in the key of E-flat major using common time and a moderate dance tempo of 106 beats per minute. Andrew Lentz of Drum Magazine noted that "Tongue Tied" has a "dance-y four-on-the-floor feel".

Reception
"Tongue Tied" received mixed reviews from critics. Robert Cooke of Drowned in Sound said that the song's "bloated synth sounds like the soundtrack to an advert for some E number-riddled sweets written by Katy Perry, while the almost-rapping in the middle-eight sounds like a Pussycat Dolls pastiche". Matt Edsall of PopMatters said that the song "pumps Passion Pit-like beats that push the band into that same electro-pop category that so many other projects are involved in today, ruining the tone of the album a mere five minutes in". Max Raymond of musicOMH said that the song was a "potential summer smash but too sugar-coated in synths". Huw Jones of Slant Magazine said that "Tongue Tied" and the following track, "Lovely Cup", were lackluster songs that "completely derail the momentum". Matt Collar of AllMusic praised the song for its "rollicking, post-punk exuberance", while Mischa Pearlman of BBC Music said that the song's lyrics were at "beautiful odds with [the song's] bouncy tune".

Music video
The music video, directed by Jordan Bahat, for "Tongue Tied" was released to Vevo and YouTube on July 25, 2011, The video has since gained over 34 million views. The video features the band at a party, and the video goes mostly backwards. It shows a man running away from a group of people in a party who are in suits and masks. He trips and lands in an inflatable pool. At the beginning of the video, when it is the morning, he is seen fast asleep with his head in the water but with his body out of the water.

Credits and personnel
Credits adapted from the liner notes of Never Trust a Happy Song.

 Performed and written by Grouplove
 Produced by Ryan Rabin
 Recorded at Captain Cuts Studios, Los Angeles
 Audio engineering by Ryan Rabin, Ryan McMahon
 Mixed by Michael H. Brauer, Ryan Gilligan
 Mastered by Greg Calbi

Charts

Weekly charts

Year-end charts

Certifications

Notes

References

2011 singles
Grouplove songs
2011 songs
Atlantic Records singles
Songs written by Ryan Rabin